The  is a crossover SUV-styled kei car produced by the Japanese automaker Suzuki since 2014. The car is also sold by Mazda as the  through an OEM agreement.



Name 
Suzuki's design department chose the name "Hustler" to promote the car's lively and rough riding image. The name was used by Suzuki in the past as the nickname of a two-stroke, dual-sport motorcycle, the Hustler TS50. The car's accessories also have a replica sticker of the emblem that was once used in the TS50.

First generation (MR31S/MR41S; 2014) 

The first generation Hustler went on sale in January 2014, along with the Flair Crossover.

Second generation (MR52S/MR92S; 2020) 

The second generation Hustler was first shown in concept form at the 46th Tokyo Motor Show, October through November 2019. The car has been designed to be more similar to the fourth generation Jimny. It went on sale on 20 January 2020. The Flair Crossover was announced on 29 January 2020 and has been on sale since 27 February 2020.

References

External links 

  (Hustler)
  (Flair Crossover)

Hustler
Cars introduced in 2014
2020s cars
Kei cars
Kei sport utility vehicles
Crossover sport utility vehicles
Front-wheel-drive vehicles
All-wheel-drive vehicles
Retro-style automobiles
Vehicles with CVT transmission